Moore Reserve is a 14.2 hectare park surrounded by the Sydney suburbs of Oatley, Mortdale and Hurstville Grove. It is the second largest public space in the Municipality of Kogarah.

Originally part of the north west arm, Moore Reserve was created in the 1960s by infilling with mud dredged from Oatley Bay. At the time the existing natural waterway, Renown Creek, was destroyed and ultimately replaced by concrete pipes.

An artificial wetland was constructed in 2001 which uses natural processes to treat 95% of all stormwater runoff from the 125 hectare catchment before it enters Oatley Bay.

Features
Moore Reserve has the following features:
A large parking area
Large open fields accommodating a variety of sporting activities
An outdoor fitness play set
A long path circumnavigating the park
Swing sets, climbing equipment and other children's play sets
Picnic tables and BBQ facilities
Lovely views of Oatley Bay, especially from the designated viewing platform
Waterfront access to Oatley Bay, including a boat ramp, jetty and small beach

Gallery

See also

 Oatley Point Reserve
 Oatley Pleasure Grounds
 Parks in Sydney
 Renown Park, New South Wales

References
Moore Reserve Constructed Wetland, Kogarah NSW 
Moore Reserve wetlands, kogarah.nsw.gov.au
Google Maps: Moore Reserve

Parks in Sydney
Constructed wetlands